Nuku is a village in Wallis and Futuna. It is located in Sigave District on the northwestern coast of Futuna Island. Its population according to the 2018 census was 204 people.

Overview
The village lies between Leava, the district seat, and Vaisei. Its major building is the church of Sausau.

References

External links

Populated places in Wallis and Futuna